Major General Walter Hayes Oxley, CB, CBE, MC (2 January 1891, London, Great Britain – 23 January 1978) was a British Army officer who fought during World War I and World War II.

Military career
Oxley was educated at Eastbourne College and the Royal Military Academy, Woolwich, from where he was commissioned into the Royal Engineers in 1911. Later he was promoted to lieutenant in 1913. In the First World War Oxley served in Egypt, then he served at the Salonika front. During 1916–1917 Oxley fought in Palestine and Egypt to the end of the war.

He attended the Staff College, Camberley from 1925−1926, where the Australian Sydney Rowell was a classmate. He was promoted major in 1926 and lieutenant-colonel in 1931. Afterwards Oxley was military attache at Belgrade in 1929–32. Oxley  was promoted colonel in 1934. In 1937 he was assistant adjutant and quartermaster-general for the British Military Mission to Egypt. Oxley became a local brigadier in 1939.

Between 1939 and 1940,during the Second World War, Oxley was assistant adjutant and quartermaster-general in Malta and in 1940–1941 commanding officer of the Northern Brigade there. In 1942 Oxley served as commanding officer of the 7th Infantry Brigade. In 1942–1943 he was deputy director of military training in the War Office. During 1943–1944 he became a general officer commanding in  Malta. During 1944–1947 Oxley served as a member of the Allied Control Commission in Bulgaria. He tried to resist the growing Soviet influence in the country, but did not receive support from London. In 1948 Oxley was retired. Afterwards he went to live in Charminster, near Dorchester, where he farmed.

References

Bibliography

External links 
  Pfoto of the heads of the Allied Control Commission in Sofia. Second from the left, General Walter Oxley (Great Britain), third from the left, General John Alden Crane (USA), in front, General Sergey Biryuzov (USSR), May 10, 1945.
Generals of World War II

1891 births
1978 deaths
British Army personnel of World War I
British Army generals of World War II
British military attachés
Graduates of the Staff College, Camberley
Graduates of the Royal Military Academy, Woolwich
Royal Engineers officers
British Army major generals
Recipients of the Military Cross
People educated at Eastbourne College
Military personnel from London
Companions of the Order of the Bath
Commanders of the Order of the British Empire